An anterior pituitary basophil is a type of cell in the anterior pituitary which manufactures hormones.

It is called a basophil because it is basophilic (readily takes up bases), and typically stains a relatively deep blue or purple.

These basophils are further classified by the hormones they produce. (It is usually not possible to distinguish between these cell types using standard staining techniques.)

*Produced only in pregnancy by the developing embryo.

See also 
 Chromophobe cell
 Melanotroph
 Chromophil
 Acidophil cell
 Oxyphil cell
 Oxyphil cell (parathyroid)
 Pituitary gland
 Neuroendocrine cell
 Basophilic

References

External links
 

Histology